David Cameron Dorward  (born January 22, 1952) is a Canadian politician, who represented the electoral district of Edmonton-Gold Bar in the Legislative Assembly of Alberta from 2012 to 2015.  He has lived in Alberta since the mid 1950s and currently resides in Edmonton.

Dorward is the approved United Conservative Party candidate for the electoral riding of Edmonton-Gold Bar for the 2019 Alberta provincial election.

Background
Dorward served in the Alberta cabinet with Premier Jim Prentice. He is a graduate of the Northern Alberta Institute of Technology and the University of Alberta.   David Cameron DORWARD, FCPA, FCA is registered as a member of the Chartered Professional Accountants of Alberta (CPA Alberta).

Dorward has contributed to the community through various volunteer and community works including sitting on various local and provincial boards. This includes coaching youth basketball and organizing basketball programs for communities within the electoral division of Edmonton-Gold Bar.  Dorward received the Top 50 Alumni award, chosen for the differences he made within our communities.

In 2005, Dorward led and founded the initiative that raised $38M for the building of the Saville Community Sports Centre (GO Centre), a 195,000-square-foot GO Centre located at the University of Alberta south campus area. The center was opened for use in September 2011.

Dorward is a member of the Church of Jesus Christ of Latter-day Saints.

Political career
Dorward ran for mayor of Edmonton in the 2010 Edmonton municipal election. He finished in second place and was defeated by Stephen Mandel.

Two years later Dorward ran for a seat to the Legislative Assembly of Alberta in the electoral district of Edmonton-Gold Bar as a Progressive Conservative candidate. He defeated five other candidates to win the seat for his party, before being defeated by the NDP's Marlin Schmidt.

As an MLA for the Legislative Assembly of Alberta, Dorward held various roles including:

Associate Minister of Aboriginal Relations (Reporting to the Premier)
Deputy Government House Whip 
Member of the Treasury Board.
Deputy Chair of the Select Special Conflicts of Interest Act Review Committee
Deputy Chair of the Standing Committee on Public Accounts 
Member of the Special Standing Committee on Members’ Services
Member of the Standing Committee on Alberta’s Economic Future 
Member of the Standing Committee on the Alberta Heritage Savings Trust Fund

In 2017, the United Conservative Party was formed under Jason Kenney in a historic merger of the Progressive Conservative Party and the Wildrose Party, with 95% approval.

In March 2019, leading up to the Alberta provincial election, transphobic comments made on social media by Dorward in 2016 surfaced. Dorward responded to these comments in a short online apology, stating  that “while [he] was not alone in sharing this belief at the time, [he is] relieved that such fears have not been validated in the following three years.” To be specific, these comments involved him stating his concerns that transgender bathroom laws would permit young men to walk into girl's restrooms whenever they were so inclined.

Electoral record

2019 general election

2015 general election

2012 general election

References

1952 births
Living people
Members of the Executive Council of Alberta
Politicians from Edmonton
Progressive Conservative Association of Alberta MLAs
21st-century Canadian politicians
Canadian Latter Day Saints